Kaki Bukit was a state constituency in Perlis, Malaysia, that was represented in the Perlis State Legislative Assembly from 1955 to 1974.

The state constituency was first contested in 1955 and is mandated to return a single Assemblyman to the Perlis State Legislative Assembly under the first-past-the-post voting system.

History 
It was abolished in 1974 when it was redistributed.

Representation history

Election results

References 

 

Perlis state constituencies
Defunct Malaysian state constituencies
Defunct Perlis state constituencies